Tivoli Encounter is a live album by American jazz pianist Phineas Newborn, Jr. recorded in Denmark in 1979 at the first Copenhagen Jazz Festival but not released on the Dutch Storyville label until 1997.

Reception
The Allmusic review by Scott Yanow states "Although still displaying impressive technique, Newborn does make some errors in spots and sounds just slightly past his prime. ...Not essential, but still worthwhile".

Track listing
 "Oh, Lady Be Good!" (George Gershwin, Ira Gershwin) - 7:05
 "Don't Blame Me" (Dorothy Fields, Jimmy McHugh) - 6:28
 "Daahoud" (Clifford Brown) - 4:22
 "Medley: Billie's Bounce/Walkin'" (Charlie Parker/Richard Carpenter) - 8:40
 "Sweet and Lovely" (Gus Arnheim, Jules LeMare, Harry Tobias) - 5:36
 "On Green Dolphin Street" (Bronisław Kaper, Ned Washington) - 6:21
 "Nica's Dream" (Horace Silver) - 4:56
 "Medley: Trees/Tea for Two" (Oscar Rasbach, Joyce Kilmer/Vincent Youmans, Irving Caesar) - 8:26
 "Oleo" (Sonny Rollins) - 3:48
 "A Night in Tunisia" (Dizzy Gillespie, Frank Paparelli) - 5:58
 "I'll Remember April" (Gene DePaul, Patricia Johnston, Don Raye) - 3:27

Personnel
Phineas Newborn, Jr. - piano
Jesper Lundgaard - bass
 Bjarne Rostvold - drums

References

Storyville Records live albums
Phineas Newborn Jr. live albums
1997 live albums